Miaofengshan, named after the mountain with the same name, is a town in Mentougou District, in the eastern edge of the Western Hills of Beijing. It borders Liucun Town to its north, Sujiatuo, Longquan andJunzhuang Towns to its east, Datai Subdistrict and Wangping Town to its south, and Yanchi Town to its west. In 2020, the census counted a total of 10,012 residents living within the town.

History

Administrative divisions 
At the end of 2021, Miaofengshan Town comprised 17 villages, all of which are listed below:

See also
List of township-level divisions of Beijing

References

Towns in Beijing
Mentougou District